The Rutherford School District is a comprehensive community public school district that serves students in pre-kindergarten through twelfth grade from Rutherford, in Bergen County, New Jersey, United States.

As of the 2018–19 school year, the district, comprising five schools, had an enrollment of 2,652 students and 208.7 classroom teachers (on an FTE basis), for a student–teacher ratio of 12.7:1.

The district is classified by the New Jersey Department of Education as being in District Factor Group "GH", the third-highest of eight groupings. District Factor Groups organize districts statewide to allow comparison by common socioeconomic characteristics of the local districts. From lowest socioeconomic status to highest, the categories are A, B, CD, DE, FG, GH, I and J.

History
Public education began in Rutherford prior to 1900, but the oldest permanent school structure was the Park School, built in 1902. It is currently the home of the Rutherford borough hall, on Park Avenue.

Rutherford formerly had three "neighborhood" schools for grades K-5 (Washington, Lincoln, and Sylvan) which fed into two "magnet" schools for 6-8 (Union and Pierrepont). The magnet schools also served as elementary schools for their neighborhoods. Since the 2005–2006 school year, the Rutherford Schools have changed this format.

Sylvan School has since been closed by the Rutherford Board of Education; it houses YMCA Programs, the District Special Services Department, as well as a Handicapped Pre-School Program run by the South Bergen Jointure Commission.

Rutherford now has two elementary schools, Washington and Lincoln, for grades K-3. In grades 4-8 the students attend Union and Pierrepont Schools. For years before the realignment, the Rutherford School System underwent a multimillion-dollar renovation, which effected all of its buildings, with the most substantial amount of work taking place at Washington, Lincoln and Union Schools.

Schools
Schools in the district (with 2018–19 enrollment data from the National Center for Education Statistics) are:

Elementary schools
Kindergarten Center (opened in 2014)
Lincoln School (490 students; in grades PreK-3)
Jeanna Velechko, Principal
Washington School (326; 1-3)
William Mulcahy, Principal
Pierrepont School (595; 4-6)
Joan Carrion, Principal
Union School (424; 7-8)
Kurt Schweitzer, Principal
High school
Rutherford High School (762; 9-12), built in 1922 and expanded in 1959 and 2005
Frank Morano, Principal

Administration
Core members of the district's administration are:
Jack Hurley, Superintendent
Joseph Kelly, Business Administrator / Board Secretary

Board of education
The district's board of education, comprised of nine members, sets policy and oversees the fiscal and educational operation of the district through its administration. As a Type II school district, the board's trustees are elected directly by voters to serve three-year terms of office on a staggered basis, with three seats up for election each year held (since 2013) as part of the November general election. The board appoints a superintendent to oversee the district's day-to-day operations and a business administrator to supervise the business functions of the district.

References

External links
Rutherford School District
 
School Data for the Rutherford School District, National Center for Education Statistics

Rutherford, New Jersey
New Jersey District Factor Group GH
School districts in Bergen County, New Jersey